Best of Friends was a British children's TV programme

(The) Best of Friends may also refer to:

Theatre and books
The Best of Friends (play), a 1987 epistolary play by Hugh Whitemore
The Best of Friends, a 1902 play by Cecil Raleigh
The Best of Friends, a 1972 novel by Joy Fielding

Film and television
The Best of Friends (film), a 1982 Australian romantic comedy
"Best of Friends," an episode of the TV series Eight Is Enough 
"Best of Friends / Aftermath / Dream Boat," an episode of the TV series The Love Boat
"Best of Friends," an episode of the TV series Night Court

Music

Albums
The Best of Friends (album), a compilation album by Loggins and Messina
Best of Friends, an album by The Smurfs nominated for Grammy Award for Best Album for Children, 1983
Best of Friends (Twennynine album), 1979
Best of Friends, a 2007 album by Jools Holland
Best of Friends, a 1984 album by Tom Paxton, Anne Hills & Bob Gibson
The Best of Friends, an album by John Lee Hooker

Songs
"Best of Friends," a song from the Disney film The Fox and the Hound
"Best of Friends," a song by Joan Baez from the album Where Are You Now, My Son?
"Best of Friends," a song by Palma Violets from the album 180
"Best of Friends," a song by The Rowans from the album Jubilation
"Best of Friends," the theme song to the TV series Simon & Simon, performed by the Thrasher Brothers
"Best of Friends", a duet by Livingston Taylor and Carly Simon on the former's album There You Are Again
"Best of Friends", a song by Peter, Paul and Mary from their Reunion album

See also
 Best of Enemies (disambiguation)
 Best Friend (disambiguation)